It's a Party! is a Canadian comedy-drama short film, directed by Peg Campbell and released in 1986. Set in the apartment of a woman who is having a party, the film uses a stationary camera facing her hallway and living room, with actors moving in and out of the frame as the party's events evolve and change, while the film's dialogue was improvised by the filmmakers and actors based on strange or odd things they had personally heard at parties.

The film was a Genie Award nominee for Best Live Action Short Drama at the 8th Genie Awards.

Campbell and cowriter Peggy Thompson followed up in 1989 with In Search of the Last Good Man, which reversed the formula by using a rapidly moving camera to film a story with limited in-film movement.

References

External links
 

1986 films
1986 comedy-drama films
Canadian comedy-drama films
1986 short films
1980s English-language films
Canadian drama short films
Canadian comedy short films
1980s Canadian films